Daniel Vasilevski (born 4 September 1981 in Melbourne, Victoria, Australia) is an Australian footballer who plays for Altona Magic SC in the Victorian State League Division 1.

Vasilevski is renowned for his quality delivery from set-plays and his ability to score spectacular free-kicks.

Club career
Vasilevski was regarded as one of the most talented young football players of his generation and broke into the old National Soccer League as a teenager, earning a contract with Carlton Soccer Club and starring in the 99/01 National Soccer League.

When the Blues folded he moved across town and joined the Melbourne Knights and, when the A-League kicked off, he was signed by then Perth Glory coach and Liverpool F.C. legend Steve McMahon as part of the West Australian club's first playing list.

By this time, Vasilevski had also represented Australia U-20 11 times and played in the 2001 FIFA World Youth Championship. He has also had trials with Belgium giants Anderlecht and Danish outfit Aalborg.

After being released by Perth Glory he returned to Melbourne and played for Altona Magic in the Victorian Premier League before signing for A-League outfit Melbourne Victory in July 2007.

On 17 August 2009, it was announced that he had mutually agreed to part with Victory due to his lack of game time under Ernie Merrick., and took up a short-term contract with Newcastle Jets.

On 8 December 2009, Daniel signed a contract with South Melbourne for the 2010 and 2011 VPL seasons. He joined Moreland Zebras FC in 2012 and then Heidelberg United FC in 2013.

Vasilevski signed on for the 2016 season with Altona Magic SC in November 2015.

Honours
With Melbourne Victory:
  A-League Championship: 2008–2009
  A-League Premiership: 2008–2009

References

External links
 Melbourne Victory profile
 Oz Football profile

1981 births
Living people
Australian people of Macedonian descent
Soccer players from Melbourne
A-League Men players
Carlton S.C. players
Melbourne Knights FC players
Melbourne Victory FC players
Perth Glory FC players
National Soccer League (Australia) players
Association football midfielders
Association football defenders
Australian soccer players
Australia under-20 international soccer players